This article lists the main target shooting events and their results for 2011.

World Events

International Shooting Sport Federation
 September: 2011 World Shotgun Championships, held in Belgrade, Serbia

ISSF World Cup
 2011 ISSF World Cup

International Confederation of Fullbore Rifle Associations

International Practical Shooting Confederation
 2011 IPSC Handgun World Shoot held on the 	Kalamonas Shooting Range in Rhodes, Greece

FITASC
2011 Results

Island Games
 June 28 - July 1: Shooting at the 2011 Island Games on the Sainham Range on the Isle of Wight.

Military World Games
 July 15–24: Shooting at the 2011 Military World Games in Rio de Janeiro, Brazil

Summer Universiade
 August 18-22: Shooting at the 2011 Summer Universiade in Shenzhen, China

Regional Events

Africa

African Shooting Championships
 October 15-25: 2011 African Shooting Championship was due to be held in Cairo in February 2011. It was postponed until October due to civil unrest surrounding the 2011 Egyptian revolution

 May 25 - June 3: 2011 African Shotgun Championships held in Rabat, Morocco

Americas

Pan American Games
 October 15-23: Shooting at the 2011 Pan American Games held in Guadalajara, Mexico

Asia

Asian Shooting Championships
 October 17-23: 2011 Asian Airgun Championships held on in Kuwait City, Kuwait.
 November 21 - December 1: 2011 Asian Shotgun Championships in Kuala Lumpur, Malaysia

Pan Arab Games
 December 9-23: Shooting at the 2011 Pan Arab Games held in Doha, Qatar

Pacific Games
 August 30 - September 1: Shooting at the 2011 Pacific Games in Nouméa, New Caledonia

Southeast Asian Games
 June 6-12: Shooting at the 2011 Southeast Asian Games at Jakabaring Shooting Range, Palembang, Indonesia

Europe

European Shooting Confederation
 March 3-6: 2011 European 10 m Events Championships in Brescia, Italy
 July 31 - August 14: 2011 European Shooting Championships in Belgrade, Serbia

Games of the Small States of Europe
 May 31 - June 3: Shooting at the 2011 Games of the Small States of Europe held in Liechtenstein

"B Matches"
 February 3-5: InterShoot in Den Haag, Netherlands
 RIAC held in Strassen, Luxembourg

National Events

Canada

Canada Winter Games
 February 14-17: Shooting at the 2011 Canada Winter Games held at Sackville High School in Nova Scotia.

United Kingdom

NRA Imperial Meeting
 July, held at the National Shooting Centre, Bisley
 Queen's Prize winner: 
 Grand Aggregate winner: Dr GCD Barnett
 Ashburton Shield winners: Epsom College
 Kolapore Winners: 
 Junior Kolapore winners: Normandy, 
 National Trophy Winners: 
 Elcho Shield winners: 
 Vizianagram winners: House of Commons

NSRA National Meeting
 August, held at the National Shooting Centre, Bisley
 Earl Roberts British Prone Champion:

USA
 2011 NCAA Rifle Championships, won by West Virginia Mountaineers

References

 
2011 in sports